Mbrostar is a village and a former municipality in the Fier County, southwestern Albania. At the 2015 local government reform it became a subdivision of the municipality Fier. The population at the 2011 census was 7,460.

References

Former municipalities in Fier County
Administrative units of Fier
Villages in Fier County